Ivan Stupnytskyi (16 October 1816 – 22 December 1890) was a Ukrainian Greek Catholic hierarch in present-day Ukraine and Poland. He was the Eparchial Bishop of the Ukrainian Catholic Eparchy of Przemyśl, Sambir and Sanok from 1872 to 1890.

Born in Sukhorichya, Austrian Empire (present day – Lviv Oblast, Ukraine) in the family of judge Andriy and his wife Anastasiya (née Bilyavska) Stupnytskti in 1816. He was ordained a priest on 9 June 1842 by Bishop Hryhoriy Yakhymovych. He worked as a Cancellor of the Greek-Catholic Archeparchy of Lviv from 1858 to 1872.

He was confirmed by the Holy See as an Eparchial Bishop of the Ukrainian Catholic Eparchy of Przemyśl, Sambir and Sanok on 8 September 1872. He was consecrated to the Episcopate on 20 October 1872. The principal consecrator was Metropolitan Joseph Sembratovych with 3 another co-consecrators.

He died in Przemyśl on 22 December 1890.

References 

1816 births
1890 deaths
People from Lviv Oblast
People from the Kingdom of Galicia and Lodomeria
19th-century Eastern Catholic bishops
Bishops of the Ukrainian Greek Catholic Church
Bishops in Austria–Hungary
Bishops of Przemyśl